Élisabeth Louise Vigée Le Brun (16 April 1755 – 30 March 1842), also known as Madame Le Brun, was a French portrait painter, especially of women, in the late 18th and early 19th centuries.

Her artistic style is generally considered part of the aftermath of Rococo with elements of an adopted Neoclassical style. Her subject matter and color palette can be classified as Rococo, but her style is aligned with the emergence of Neoclassicism. Vigée Le Brun created a name for herself in Ancien Régime society by serving as the portrait painter to Marie Antoinette. She enjoyed the patronage of European aristocrats, actors, and writers, and was elected to art academies in ten cities. Some famous contemporary artists, such as Joshua Reynolds, viewed her as one of the greatest portraitists of her time, comparing her with the old Dutch masters.

Vigée Le Brun created 660 portraits and 200 landscapes. In addition to many works in private collections, her paintings are owned by major museums, such as the Louvre in Paris, Hermitage Museum in Saint Petersburg, National Gallery in London, Metropolitan Museum of Art in New York, and many other collections in Europe and the United States. Her personal habitus was characterized by a high sensitivity to sound, sight and smell.

Between 1835 and 1837, when Vigée Le Brun was in her 80s, she published her memoirs in three volumes (Souvenirs), which also contained many pen portraits and advice for young portraitists.

Biography

Early life

Born in Paris on 16 April 1755, Élisabeth Louise Vigée was the daughter of Jeanne (1728–1800), a hairdresser from a peasant background, and Louis Vigée, a portraitist, pastellist and member of the Académie de Saint-Luc, was jubilant at her artistic inclinations in her childhood, and from whom she received her first instruction. In 1760, at the age of five, she entered a convent, where she remained until 1766. Her father died when she was 12 years old. In 1768, her mother married a wealthy (but stingy) jeweller, Jacques-François Le Sèvre, and shortly after, the family moved to the Rue Saint-Honoré, close to the Palais Royal. In her memoir, Vigée Le Brun directly stated her feelings about her step-father: "I hated this man; even more so since he made use of my father's personal possessions. He wore his clothes, just as they were, without altering them to fit his figure.” During this period, Élisabeth benefited from the advice of Gabriel François Doyen, Jean-Baptiste Greuze, and Joseph Vernet, whose influence is evident in her portrait of her younger brother, playwright and poet Étienne Vigée.

By the time she was in her early teens, Élisabeth was painting portraits professionally. After her studio was seized for her practicing without a license, she applied to the Académie de Saint-Luc, which unwittingly exhibited her works in their Salon. In 1774, she was made a member of the Académie. On 11 January 1776, she married Jean-Baptiste-Pierre Le Brun, a painter and art dealer. Vigée Le Brun began exhibiting her work at their home in Paris, the Hôtel de Lubert, and the Salons she held here supplied her with many new and important contacts. Her husband's great-great-uncle was Charles Le Brun, the first director of the French Academy under Louis XIV. Her husband would prove to be adulterous and a spendthrift, and gambled away most of the money she received from painting commissions.

On 12 February 1780, Vigée Le Brun gave birth to a daughter, Jeanne Lucie Louise, whom she called Julie and nicknamed "Brunette".

In 1781, she and her husband toured Flanders and the Netherlands, where seeing the works of the Flemish masters inspired her to try new techniques. Her Self-portrait with Straw Hat (1782) was a "free imitation" of Peter Paul Rubens' Le Chapeau de Paille. Dutch and Flemish influences have also been noted in The Comte d'Espagnac (1786) and Madame Perregaux (1789).

In 1787, she caused a minor public scandal when her Self-portrait with Her Daughter Julie (1787) was exhibited at the Salon of 1787 showing her smiling and open-mouthed, which was in direct contravention of traditional painting conventions going back to antiquity. The court gossip-sheet Mémoires secrets commented: "An affectation which artists, art-lovers and persons of taste have been united in condemning, and which finds no precedent among the Ancients, is that in smiling, [Madame Vigée LeBrun] shows her teeth." In light of this and her other Self-portrait with Her Daughter Julie (1789), Simone de Beauvoir dismissed Vigée Le Brun as narcissistic in The Second Sex (1949): "Madame Vigée-Lebrun never wearied of putting her smiling maternity on her canvases.”

Marie Antoinette
As her career blossomed, Vigée Le Brun was granted patronage by Marie Antoinette. She painted more than 30 portraits of the queen and her family, leading to the common perception that she was the official portraitist of Marie Antoinette. At the Salon of 1783, Vigée Le Brun exhibited Marie-Antoinette in a Muslin Dress (1783), sometimes called Marie-Antoinette en gaulle, in which the queen chose to be shown in a simple, informal white cotton garment. The resulting scandal was prompted by both the informality of the attire and the queen's decision to be shown in that way. Le Brun immediately had the portrait removed from the Salon and quickly repainted it, this time with the queen in more formal attire. Vigée Le Brun's later Marie Antoinette and Her Children (1787) was evidently an attempt to improve the queen's image by making her more relatable to the public, in the hopes of countering the bad press and negative judgments that the queen had recently received. The portrait shows the queen at home in the Palace of Versailles, engaged in her official function as the mother of the king's children, but also suggests Marie Antoinette's uneasy identity as a foreign-born queen whose maternal role was her only true function under Salic law. The child, Louis Joseph, on the right is pointing to an empty cradle, which signified her recent loss of a child, further emphasizing Marie Antoinette's role as a mother.

Académie royale de peinture et de sculpture
On 31 May 1783, Vigée Le Brun was received as a member of the Académie royale de peinture et de sculpture. She was one of only 15 women to be granted full membership in the Académie between 1648 and 1793. Her rival, Adélaïde Labille-Guiard, was admitted on the same day. Vigée Le Brun was initially refused on the grounds that her husband was an art dealer, but eventually the Académie was overruled by an order from Louis XVI because Marie Antoinette put considerable pressure on her husband on behalf of her portraitist. As her reception piece, Vigée Le Brun submitted an allegorical painting, Peace Bringing Back Abundance (La Paix ramenant l'Abondance), instead of a portrait. As a consequence, the Académie did not place her work within a standard category of painting—either history or portraiture. Vigée Le Brun's membership in the Académie dissolved after the French Revolution because female academicians were abolished.

Flight from France 
As the turmoil of the French revolution grew, artist's house on the Rue de-Gros-Chenet was harassed by Sans-Culottes, due to her association with Marie Antoinette. Stricken with an intense anxiety, Vigée Le Brun's health deteriorated. M. and Mme. Brongniart pleaded her to go live with them to convalesce and recover her health, to which she agreed and spent several days in their apartment at Les Invalides. Later in her life, in a letter to the princess Kourakin, the artist wrote;

As the situation in Paris and France continued to deteriorate with the rising tide of the revolution, the artist decided to leave Paris, and obtained passports for herself, her daughter and their governess. The very next day a large band of national guards entered her house and ordered her not to leave or else face punishment. Two sympathetic national guards from her neighborhood later returned to her house, and advised her to leave the city as fast as possible, but to take the stagecoach instead of her carriage. Vigée Le Brun then ordered three places on the stagecoach out of Paris, but had to wait two weeks to obtain seats as there were many people departing the city. Vigée Le Brun visited her mother before leaving. In October 5, the king and queen were driven from Versailles to the Tuilleries by a large crowd of Parisians - Mostly women. Vigée Le Brun's stagecoach departed at midnight of the same day, with her brother and husband accompanying them to the Barrière du Trône, she, her daughter and governess dressed shabbily to avoid attracting attention. Le Brun travelled to Lyon where she stayed for 3 days with acquaintances (Mme. and M. de Artaut), where she was barely recognized due to her changed features and shabby clothes, and then continued her journey across the Beauvoisin bridge, she was relieved to be finally out of France, though throughout her journey she was accompanied by Jacobin spies who tracked her movement. Her husband, who remained in Paris, claimed that Vigée Le Brun went to Italy "to instruct and improve herself", but she feared for her own safety. In her 12-year absence from France, she lived and worked in Italy (1789–1792), Austria (1792–1795), Russia (1795–1801) and Germany (1801), and remained a committed royalist throughout her life.

Italy
The artist arrived in Turin after crossing the Savoyard alps. In Turin she met the famous engraver Porporati, who was now a professor in the city's academy. Porporati and his daughter received the artist for five or six days until she resumed her journey southwards to Parma, where she met the Comte de Flaginy (then minister of Louis XVI) who generously accommodated her during her stay there. While in Italy, Vigée Le Brun was elected to the Academy in Parma (1789) and the Accademia di San Luca in Rome (1790). In Naples, she painted portraits of Maria Carolina of Austria (sister of Marie Antoinette) and her eldest four living children: Maria Teresa, Francesco, Luisa and Maria Cristina. She later recalled that Luisa "was extremely ugly, and pulled such faces that I was most reluctant to finish her portrait." Vigée Le Brun also painted allegorical portraits of the notorious Emma Hamilton as Ariadne (1790) and as a Bacchante (1792). Lady Hamilton was similarly the model for Vigée Le Brun's Sibyl (1792), which was inspired by the painted sibyls of Domenichino. The painting represents the Cumaean Sibyl, as indicated by the Greek inscription on the figure's scroll, which is taken from Virgil's fourth Eclogue. The Sibyl was Vigée Le Brun's favorite work. It is mentioned in her memoir more than any other work. She displayed it while in Venice (1792), Vienna (1792), Dresden (1794) and Saint Petersburg (1795); she also sent it to be shown at the Salon of 1798. It was perhaps her most successful painting, and had always garnered the most praise and attracted many viewers wherever it was displayed. Like her reception piece, Peace Bringing Back Abundance, Vigée Le Brun regarded her Sibyl as a history painting, the most elevated category in the Académie's hierarchy. As was customary for those visiting Italy in the time, particularly the artistically inclined, Vigée Le Brun visited many cathedrals, chapels, galleries, ancient ruins, historical sites and natural attractions across Italy.

Austria
While in Vienna, Vigée Le Brun was commissioned to paint Princess Maria Josepha Hermengilde Esterházy as Ariadne and Princess Karoline von Liechtenstein as Iris among many others, the latter portrait caused a minor scandal among the princess' relatives. The portraits depict the Liechtenstein sisters-in-law in unornamented Roman-inspired garments that show the influence of Neoclassicism, and which may have been a reference to the virtuous republican Roman matron Cornelia, mother of the Gracchi. The artist met for the second time in Vienna one of her greatest friends, the Prince de Ligne, whom she had first met in Brussels. It was at his urging that Vigée Le Brun wished so much to meet the Russian sovereign Catherine the Great and to visit Russia. The Prince de Ligne urged her to stay at his former convent atop Kahlenberg, with its commanding view of the countryside, to which she agreed. During Vigée Le Brun's stay in Kahlenberg, de Ligne wrote a passionate poem about her. After two and half years in Vienna, the artist departed for St. Petersburg on 19 April 1795, via Prague. She also visited Dresden on her way, and the Königsberg fortress, where she made the acquaintance of Prince Henry, who was very hospitable to the artist. While visiting Dresden on her way to Russia, Le Brun visited the famous Dresden gallery, writing that it was without doubt the most extensive one in all of Europe. It was there that she saw Raphael's Madonna di San Sisto. She was completely enamored by the painting, and wrote:

Russia

In Russia, where she stayed from 1795 until 1801, she was well-received by the nobility and painted numerous aristocrats, including the former king of Poland, Stanisław August Poniatowski, whom she became well acquainted with, and other members of the family of Catherine the Great. Le Brun painted Catherine's granddaughters (daughters of Paul), Elena and Alexandra Pavlovna, in Grecian tunics with exposed arms. To this end, the Empress' favourite, Platon Zubov, commented to Le Brun that the painting had scandalized the empress due to the amount of bare skin the short sleeves revealed. Le Brun was greatly worried by this and considered it a hurtful remark and replaced the tunics with the Muslin dresses the princesses wore, and added long sleeves (called Amadis in Russia). Le Brun would later be reassured in a conversation with Catherine that she made no such remark, but by then the damage had already been done. When Paul later became emperor, he expressed being upset with the alterations Le Brun made to the painting. When Le Brun told him what Zubov told her, he shrugged and said "They played a joke on you". Vigée Le Brun painted many other people during her stay in Russia, including the emperor Paul and his consort.

Catherine herself also agreed to sit for Le Brun, but she died on the very next day, which was when she had promised to sit for Le Brun. While in Russia, Vigée Le Brun was made a member of the Academy of Fine Arts of Saint Petersburg. Much to Vigée Le Brun's dismay, her daughter Julie married Gaétan Bernard Nigris, secretary to the Director of the Imperial Theaters of Saint Petersburg. Le Brun attempted everything in her power to upend this match, and viewed it as a scheme concocted by her enemies and her governess to separate her from her daughter, but as Julie's remonstrations and pressure on her mother grew, Le Brun relented and gave her approval for the wedding, though she was greatly distressed at the prospect, and soon found her stay in Russia, hitherto so enjoyable, had become suffocating, and decided to return to Paris. The artist wrote;

Before departing leaving for France, Vigée Le Brun decided to visit Moscow, halfway through her journey to the city, news of the assassination of Paul I reached her. The journey was extremely difficult due to the melting snow, and the carriage often got stuck in the infamous Russian mud, and her journey was further delayed when most horses were taken by couriers spreading the news of the death of Paul and coronation of Alexander. Vigée Le Brun enjoyed her stay in Moscow, and painted many portraits during her stay. Upon her return to St. Petersburg she met the newly coronated Emperor Alexander I and Empress Louise, who urged her to stay in St. Petersburg. Upon telling the Emperor of her poor health and prescription by a physician to take the waters near Karlsbad to cure her internal obstruction, the Emperor replied "Do not go there, there is no need to go so far to find a remedy; I shall give you the Empress' horse, a few rides will have you cured". Vigée Le Brun was touched by this, but replied to the Emperor that she did not know how to ride, to which the Emperor said "Well, I will give you a riding instructor, he will teach you". The artist was still adamant to leave Russia, despite her closest friends, the Count Stroganoff, M. de Rivière and the princesses Dologruky and Kourakin and others attempting all they can to make her stay in St. Petersburg, she left after residing there for 6 years. Julie later predeceased her mother in 1819, at which time both had reconciled.

Prussia 
After her departure from St. Petersburg, Le Brun travelled - with some difficulty - through Prussia, visiting Berlin after an exhausting journey. The Queen of Prussia invited Vigée Le Brun to Potsdam to meet her, the queen then commissioned a portrait of herself by the artist. The queen invited the artist to reside in the Potsdam palace until she finished her portrait, but Vigée Le Brun, not wishing to intrude on the queen's ladies-in-waiting, chose to reside in a nearby hotel, where her stay was uncomfortable.

The pair soon became friends. During a conversation, Vigée Le Brun complemented the queen on her bracelets with an antique design, which the queen then took off and put around Vigée Le Brun's arms. Vigée Le Brun considered this gift one of her most valued possessions for the rest of her life, and wore it almost everywhere. Vigée Le Brun soon visited the queen's Peacock Island, at the queen's urging, where the artist enjoyed the countryside.

Aside from two pastel portraits commissioned by the queen, Vigée Le Brun also painted other pastel portraits of Prince Ferdinand's family.

During her stay in Berlin, she met with the general ambassador Bournonville, hoping to procure a passport to return to France. The general encouraged Vigée Le Brun to return and assured her that order and safety had been restored. Her brother and husband had already, with ease, struck her name from the list of émigrés, and had her French status restored. Shortly before her departure from Berlin, the General Director of the Academy of Painting visited her, bringing her the diploma for her admission to that academy. After her departure from Berlin, the artist visited Dresden and painted several copies of Emperor Alexander, which she had promised earlier, and visited Brunswick as well where she resided for 6 days with the Rivière family, and was sought out by the Duke of Brunswick who wished to make her acquaintance. She passed Weimar and Frankfurt on her way as well.

Return to France and stay at Paris 

After a sustained campaign by her ex-husband and other family members to have her name removed from the list of counter-revolutionary émigrés, Vigée Le Brun was finally able to return to France in January 1802. The artist received a rapturous welcome in her home at Rue de-Gros-Chenet and was greatly hailed by the press. Three days after her arrival, a letter arrived for her from the Comédie-Française, containing a decree reinstating her as a member of the theater. The leading members of the theater also wished to enact a comedy at her house to celebrate her return, which the artist politely refused. Soon afterwards, the artist was taken to witness the first consul's routine military ceremony at the Tuileries where she saw Napoleon Bonaparte for the first time, from a window inside the Louvre. The artist found it difficult to recognize the short figure as the man she had heard so much about; as with Catherine the Great, she had imagined a tall figure. A few days later, Bonaparte's brothers visited her gallery to view her works, with Lucien greatly complimenting her famous Sibyl. During her stay, Vigée Le Brun was surprised and dismayed by the greatly changed social customs of Parisian society upon her return there. She soon visited the famous painter M. Vien, who was the former Premier peintre du Roi; then 82 years old and a senator, he gave Le Brun an enthusiastic welcome and showed her some of his newest sketches. Le Brun met her friend from St. Petersburg, Princess Dolgorouky, and saw her almost daily. The artist soon felt mentally tormented in Paris, mainly due to memories of the early days of the revolution, and decided to move to a secluded house in Meudon forest. She was visited there by her neighbors, the famous dissident pair and Directory period Merveilleuses the Duchesse de Fleury and Adèle de Bellegarde; time spent with the pair restored her spirits. Shortly thereafter, Vigée Le Brun decided to travel to England, and departed Paris on April 15 1802.

England 
Vigée Le Brun arrived at Dover, where she took the stagecoach to London, accompanied by the woman who would become her lifetime friend and chambermaid, Mme. Adélaïde, who later married M. Contat, Vigée Le Brun's accountant. Vigée Le Brun was confused by the large crowd at the quays, but was reassured that it was common for crowds of curious people to observe disembarking travelers in England. She had been told that highwaymen were common in England, and so hid her diamonds in her stocking. During her ride to London she was greatly frightened by two riders who approached the stagecoach whom she thought were bandits, but nothing came of it.

Upon her arrival at London she lodged at the Brunet hotel in Leicester Square. She could not sleep during her first night due to noise from her upstairs neighbor, who she found next morning was none other than the poet M. François-Auguste Parseval-Grandmaison, whom she had known from Paris. He always paced while reading or reciting his poetry. He promised her to take care not to interrupt her sleep, and she was able to rest well for the next night.

Wishing to find a more permanent lodging, a compatriot named Charmilly directed her to a house in Beck street, which overlooked the Royal Guards barracks. Vigée Le Brun terminated her residence there as the noise from the barracks, in her words, "...every morning between three and four o'clock there was a trumpet blast so loud that it could have served for the day of judgement. The noise of the trumpet, together with that of the horses whose stables lay directly beneath my window, prevented me from catching any sleep at all. In the daytime there was a constant din made by the neighbour's children...". Vigée Le Brun then moved to a beautiful house in Portman Square. Upon closely scrutinizing the house's surroundings for any acoustic nuisance, she took up lodging there, only to be awakened at daybreak by a great screeching from a large bird owned by her neighbor. Later on, she also came to know that the former residents had buried two of their slaves in the cellar, where their bodies remained, and once again she decided to move, this time to a very damp building in Maddox Street. Although this was far from perfect, the artist was exhausted from constant moving, and decided to remain there, though the dampness of the house, combined with London's humid weather - greatly disliked by the artist - hindered her painting process. Vigée Le Brun found London lacking in inspiration for an artist due to its lack of public galleries at the time. She visited monuments, including Westminster Abbey, where she was greatly affected by the tomb of Mary, Queen of Scots, and visited the sarcophagi of the poets Shakespeare, Chatterton and Pope. She also visited St. Paul's Cathedral, the Tower of London and the London Museum. She greatly disliked the austere social customs of the English, particularly how quiet and empty the city was on Sundays, when all shops were closed and no social gatherings took place; the only pastime was the city's long walks. The artist also did not enjoy the local soiree equivalent - known as Routs (or rout-parties), describing them as stuffy and dour.

The artist visited the galleries of several prominent artists while in London, starting with the studio of artist Benjamin West. She also perused some works by Joshua Reynolds. Vigée Le Brun was surprised to find that it was customary in England for visitors to the studios of artists to pay a small fee to the artist. Vigée Le Brun did not adhere to this local custom, and allowed her servant to pocket this toll. She was greatly pleased to meet one of the most famous actress and tragediennes of her era, Sarah Siddons, who visited Vigée Le Brun's studio in Maddox Street.

Vigée Le Brun continued to hold soirées and receptions in her house, which although damp, was beautiful. She received many people, including the Prince of Wales, Lady Hertford and Lord Borington and the famous actress Mme. Grassini among others. Le Brun sought out other compatriots during her stay in England, and cultivated a social circle of émigrés that included the Comte d'Artois (future king Charles) and his son the Duc de Berri, the Duc de Serant and the Duc de Rivière.

Shortly after her arrival in London, the Treaty of Amiens was abrogated, and hostilities between France and the UK resumed. The British Government ordered all French people who had not resided more than a year in the UK to depart immediately. The Prince of Wales reassured Vigée Le Brun that this would not affect her, and she might reside in England however long she pleased. This permit from the king was difficult to procure, but the Prince of Wales even personally delivered the permit to Vigée Le Brun.

Vigée Le Brun toured the countryside during her stay in England. She started with a visit to Margaret Chinnery at Gilwell Hall, where she received a "charming welcome" and met the famous musician Viotti, who composed a song for her which was sung by Mrs. Chinnery's daughter. She painted Mrs. Chinnery and her children whilst there, departing for Windsor after staying at Gilwell for a fortnight. She also visited Windsor Park and Hampton Court on the outskirts of London before leaving to visit Bath, where she greatly enjoyed the picturesque architecture of the city, its rolling hills and the countryside; but much like London, she found its society and weather dreary. She found some of her Russian friends from St. Petersburg there, and went to visit the astronomer siblings William Herschel and Caroline Herschel. William Herschel showed Le Brun detailed maps of the moon, among other things. 

The artist greatly enjoyed the English countryside, describing Matlock as being as picturesque as the Swiss countryside. Le Brun also visited the Duchess of Dorset at Knole House in Kent, which had once been owned by Elizabeth I. She returned to London, where she found the Comte de Vaudreuil, and then went to Twickenham where she visited Mme. la Comtesse de Vaudreuil and the Duc de Montpensier, whom Le Brun became well acquainted with; they enjoyed painting the countryside together. She was subsequently received by the Duc d'Orléans (future king Louis Philippe). She then visited the Margravine of Brandenburg-Ansbach, the Baroness Craven, whom she painted and came to greatly enjoy her company, spending three weeks at her estate. Together, they visited the Isle of Wight, where Le Brun was mesmerized by the beauty of the countryside and the amiability of its inhabitants, writing later that along with the Isle of Ischia (near Naples), these were the only two places where she would happily spend her entire life.

She visited Mary Elizabeth Grenville, Marchioness of Buckingham, at Stowe. She also went to the home of Lord Moira and his sister Charlotte Adelaide Constantia Rawdon, where Vigée Le Brun sampled further the stern social milieu of English aristocracy; she spent some of the winter there. She then departed for Warwick castle, eager to see this after hearing it praised so much. Vigée Le Brun attempted to visit the area incognito to avoid any awkwardness with Lord Warwick, as he would receive foreigners only if he knew their name. When he became aware that Vigée Le Brun was visiting, he went to her in person and gave her a decorous reception. After introducing the artist to his wife, he took her on a tour around the castle, looking over the lavish art collection there. He presented her with two drawings which she had sketched in Sir William Hamilton's summerhouse during her stay in Italy, telling her that he had paid a high price to buy them from his nephew. Le Brun later wrote that she had never sold them to Sir William to begin with. He also presented to her the famous Warwick vase, which he had purchased from Sir William as well. Vigée Le Brun then ended her tour by visiting Blenheim Palace before returning to London, and preparing to depart for France after staying in England for nearly three years. Upon her imminent departure becoming known, many of her acquaintances attempted to extend her residence with them, but to no avail as Vigée Le Brun wanted to see her daughter, who was in Paris at the time. As she prepared to leave London, Mme. Grassini arrived and then accompanied her, staying with her until her ship departed for Rotterdam.

Return to France from England 
Her ship arrived in Rotterdam, where she first visited François de Beauharnais, the prefect of Rotterdam and brother in law to the empress Joséphine de Beauharnais (brother to the late Alexandre de Beauharnais, who had been executed during the terror). The artist was ordered to reside for eight to ten days in Rotterdam, as she has arrived from hostile soil, and was ordered to appear before general Oudinot, who was hospitable to her. After residing in Rotterdam for ten days, she received her passport and started for Paris. She visited Antwerp on her way to Paris and was received by its prefect, the Comte d'Hédouville[fr], and toured the city with him and his wife, and visited a sick young painter who wished to make her acquaintance.

She arrived in Paris and rejoiced to find her brother and her husband there, who was charged with recruiting artists for St. Petersburg. He departed a few months later for St. Petersburg, but Julie remained due to their failing union, though her relationship with her daughter continued to be a torment to her. She made the acquaintance of one of the most famous singers of her time, Angelica Catalani. She painted her and kept her portrait along with that of Mme. Grassini for the rest of her life, and continued to host soirées in her home as she had always did, to which Mme. Catalani was a regular.

Later Life 

She travelled to Switzerland in 1807 and again in 1808. In Geneva, she was made an honorary member of the Société pour l'Avancement des Beaux-Arts. She stayed at Coppet with Madame de Staël, who she painted as Corinne, ou l'Italie (1807). In her later years, Vigée Le Brun purchased a house in Louveciennes, Île-de-France and divided her time between Louveciennes and Paris. She died in Paris on 30 March 1842, aged 86. She was buried at the Cimetière de Louveciennes near her old home. Her tombstone epitaph says "Ici, enfin, je repose..." (Here, at last, I rest...).

Exhibitions
During her lifetime, Vigée Le Brun's work was publicly exhibited in Paris at the Académie de Saint-Luc (1774), Salon de la Correspondance (1779, 1781, 1782, 1783) and Salon of the Académie in Paris (1783, 1785, 1787, 1789, 1791, 1798, 1802, 1817, 1824).

The first retrospective exhibition of Vigée Le Brun's work was held in 1982 at the Kimbell Art Museum in Fort Worth, Texas. The first major international retrospective exhibition of her art premiered at the Galeries nationales du Grand Palais in Paris (2015—2016) and was subsequently shown at the Metropolitan Museum of Art in New York City (2016) and the National Gallery of Canada in Ottawa (2016).

Portrayal in popular culture
The 2014 docudrama made for French television, Le fabuleux destin d’Elisabeth Vigée Le Brun, directed by Arnaud Xainte, is available in English as The Fabulous Life of Elisabeth Vigée Le Brun.

In the episode "The Portrait" from the BBC series Let Them Eat Cake (1999) written by Peter Learmouth, starring Dawn French and Jennifer Saunders, Madame Vigée Le Brun (Maggie Steed) paints a portrait of the Comtesse de Vache (Jennifer Saunders) weeping over a dead canary.

Vigée Le Brun is one of only three characters in Joel Gross's Marie Antoinette: The Color of Flesh (premiered in 2007), a fictionalized historical drama about a love triangle set against the backdrop of the French Revolution.

Vigée Le Brun's portrait of Marie Antoinette is featured on the cover of the 2010 album Nobody's Daughter by Hole.

Élisabeth Vigée Le Brun is a dateable non-player character in the historically-based dating sim video game Ambition: A Minuet in Power published by Joy Manufacturing Co.

Singer-songwriter Kelly Chase released the song "Portrait of a Queen" in 2021 to accompany the History Detective Podcast, Season 2, Episode 3 Marie Antionette's Portrait Artist: Vigée Le Brun.

Gallery

Portraits painted in France

Portraits painted in Italy

Portraits painted in Austria

Portraits painted in Russia

See also
 Marie-Victoire Lemoine
 Women artists

Notes

References

External links

 
 
 
 
 
 
 
 Katherine Baetjer: "Vigée Le Brun: Woman Artist in Revolutionary France.", Modern Arts Notes Podcast
 

1755 births
1842 deaths
18th-century French painters
18th-century French women artists
19th-century French painters
19th-century French women artists
Painters from Paris
French memoirists
French neoclassical painters
French portrait painters
French women painters
French women writers
Rococo painters
French women memoirists
Elisabeth
Elisabeth
Pastel artists
18th-century letter writers
19th-century letter writers
18th-century memoirists